Sonia Marciano is a Clinical Full Professor of Management and Organizations at New York University Stern School of Business.  She teaches strategy for the Growth-Focused Business Strategy and the Business and Marketing Strategy Open Enrollment programs for NYU Stern Executive Education. Marciano is also an academic director for the TRIUM Global Executive MBA Program, an alliance of NYU Stern, the London School of Economics and HEC School of Management.

Biography
Prior to joining NYU Stern, Marciano taught Strategy at Columbia Business School and was an Institute Fellow and Senior Lecturer at Harvard University’s Institute for Strategy and Competitiveness.  She also was a Clinical Professor of Management and Strategy at Northwestern University’s Kellogg School of Management for eight years, as well as an Adjunct Professor of Strategy at the University of Chicago. Marciano has worked in the consulting, banking, and insurance industries, and has taught executive education courses for companies including Ernst & Young and Abbott Laboratories.

Books and publications
Marciano has written a number of books, papers, and cases.

Education
Marciano received her BA with honors, her MBA, and her PhD in Business economics and Industrial Organization, from the University of Chicago.

References

External links
Stern Executive Education
NYU Stern Biography
TRIUM Global Executive MBA Program
Kellogg Biography
Harvard Business Publishing Case Listing

New York University Stern School of Business faculty
Year of birth missing (living people)
Living people
Columbia Business School faculty
Harvard University staff
University of Chicago Booth School of Business alumni